The National Institute of Virology (NIV) in Pakistan is a national research institute concentrating on biosafety. It has a national laboratory site dedicated to identification and eradication of Emerging infectious diseases, as well as efforts in biological warfare. Aforementioned is a BSL3 laboratory managed by the University of Karachi for the Ministry of Health. Karachi University's International Center for Chemical and Biological Sciences established the National Institute of Virology at September 19, 2019.

The NIV assumed greater importance during the COVID-19 pandemic outbreak in Pakistan, a disease caused by the SARS-CoV-2 virus. It developed its own COVID-19 testing kits, which can be produced at drastically lower costs than imported kits, allowing a greater number of citizens to get tested. When the outbreak took place in Pakistan, the state government of Sindh worked beside Pakistan's federal government's Ministry of Health to develop vaccines and medications for treatment of infectious diseases.

References

COVID-19 pandemic in Pakistan
Research institutes in Pakistan
Organizations established in 2019
Virology institutes
Medical research institutes in Pakistan
Organizations associated with the COVID-19 pandemic
World Health Organization collaborating centres
Infectious disease organizations
Biological research institutes
Microbiology institutes
Laboratories in Pakistan